Cynometra travancorica is a species of plant in the family Fabaceae. It is found only in India. It is threatened by habitat loss.

References

travancorica
Flora of India (region)
Endangered plants
Taxonomy articles created by Polbot